Zingalamaduni is the second album by American hip hop group Arrested Development, released on June 14, 1994 by Chrysalis Records. The album's title is Swahili for "the beehive of culture." Despite spawning three singles ("United Front", "Africa's Inside Me" and "Ease My Mind", the latter being the highest-charting single released from the album), it was considered a commercial disappointment compared to their previous album 3 Years, 5 Months and 2 Days in the Life Of..., peaking at number 55 on the Billboard 200 chart and at number 20 on the Top R&B/Hip-Hop Albums chart.

Track listing

Japanese edition extra tracks
 "Eggbeaters"
 "Ease My Mind" (Premier's Remix)
 "United Front" (Noise in My Attic Remix)

Samples used
"United Minds" contains a sample of "Your Kite, My Kite", written by Toney Romeo.
"United Front" contains a sample of "Footsteps in the Dark (Parts 1 & 2)" by The Isley Brothers.
"Africa's Inside Me" contains a sample of "In All My Wildest Dreams" by Joe Sample.
"Warm Sentiments" contains a sample of "Look What You've Done for Me" by Al Green.
"Kneelin' at My Altar" contains a sample of "Baby That's What I Need" by Joe Zawinul.
"Fountain of Youth" contains a sample of "Tighten Up My Thang", written by Isaac Hayes and David Porter.
"Ease My Mind" contains samples of "Open All Night Drums" by George Clinton and "Summer Breeze" by Ceasar Frazier.

Charts

References

External links
 

Arrested Development (group) albums
1994 albums
Chrysalis Records albums
EMI Records albums